James Farquhar may refer to:

 James Farquhar (MP)
 James Farquhar (footballer)

See also 

 James Farquharson
 James Augustus Farquhar